Deaver is a surname. Notable people with the surname include:

Bascom S. Deaver (born 1930), American physicist
Bascom Sine Deaver (1882–1944), American judge
Jeffery Deaver (born 1950), American writer
Michael Deaver (1938–2007), advisor to Ronald Reagan
Philip F. Deaver (born 1946), American writer
Richard Deaver (born 1931), American sailor

See also
Deaver, Wyoming, town in Wyoming, United States